Vernon Lee Roberson (born August 3, 1952) is a former American football defensive back who played two seasons in the National Football League with the Miami Dolphins and San Francisco 49ers. He played college football at Grambling State University and attended Natchitoches Central High School in Natchitoches, Louisiana. He was also a member of the Calgary Stampeders and Ottawa Rough Riders of the Canadian Football League.

References

External links
Just Sports Stats

Living people
1952 births
Players of American football from Louisiana
American football defensive backs
American players of Canadian football
Canadian football defensive backs
Natchitoches Central High School alumni
Grambling State Tigers football players
Calgary Stampeders players
Ottawa Rough Riders players
Miami Dolphins players
San Francisco 49ers players
Sportspeople from Natchitoches, Louisiana